Caligvla is the second album released by Canadian death metal band Ex Deo, on 31 August 2012. The album title refers to Caligula, the third emperor of Rome known for his cruelty, sadism, extravagance, and intense personal insanity.

Release
Ex Deo first announced its second album on 19 August 2010 through their Facebook page. They mentioned the writing process would begin in late 2011. On 14 October 2010 the band revealed the new album's title Caligula, which would later be changed to Caligvla. On 16 April 2011 the band announced would take longer than initially expected.

On 28 September 2011, an announcement was made that the album would be released on 31 August 2012, which would also mark Caligula's 2000th anniversary. In November 2011, the band began to record for the album. On 4 February 2012 Maurizio posted a studio update that most of the symphonies and orchestral parts were done. He also mentioned that the process of creating the album would take a lot of time and would possibly interfere with their Paganfest tour. The band cancelled their appearance at "Paganfest America Part III" a few days later.

Iacono commented on the cancellation:

On 16 February 2012 Maurizio started recording his vocals which would be finished by 21 February. In March 2012 the band revealed the final track listing of Caligvla and also announced they began mixing the album. On 23 March 2012, the band revealed the guest appearances on Caligvla, which would involve Seth Siro (Septic Flesh), Mariangela Demurtas (Tristania), Stefano Fiori (Graveworm) and Francesco Artusato (All Shall Perish). The band unveiled the album cover artwork for Caligvla on 15 April 2012.

In June 2012, the band announced a video for the song I, Caligvla, featuring Maurizio's girlfriend and Colombian model Suzzy. On 27 July 2012 they uploaded the new video for I, Caligvla on YouTube.

Reception
MetalStorm rated it 7.9/10.

MetalSucks gave it 3.5/5.0 horns.

The Encyclopaedia Metallum currently has an average rating of 83% approval.

Metal Underground gave it five skulls, indicating that it was "Perfection. (No discernable flaws; one of the reviewer's all-time favorites)"

Angry Metal Guy gave the album a 'very good' rating of 3.5/5.0 with the epithet "Move over, vest metal, make room for Chest Plate Metal!"

Track listing

Notes
  A video for the title-track I, Caligvla was shot.

Personnel
Ex Deo
Maurizio Iacono – vocals, composer, executive Producer, lyricist, producer
Stéphane Barbe – lead guitar
Jean-Francois Dagenais – rhythm guitar, engineer, producer
Dano Apekian – bass guitar
Jonathan Lefrancois-Leduc – keyboards, orchestration
Max Duhamel – drums

Additional musicians
Seth Siro Anton – vocals, cover art, cover layout
Stegano Fiori – vocals
Mariangela Demurtas – vocals
Francesco Artusato – guitar, soloist

Technical personnel
Jason Messer – band photo

Trivia
The intro to 'Once Were Romans' is taken from the historical drama TV series Rome.

References 

2012 albums
Ex Deo albums
Albums with cover art by Spiros Antoniou